Cristian Alexis Borja González (born 18 February 1993) is a Colombian professional footballer who plays as a defender for Portuguese club Braga. Mainly a left-back, he can also play as a central defender.

Club career
In 2019, Borja was transferred from Toluca to Sporting CP. In February 2021, he joined Braga.

International career
Borja was named in the Colombia national team's provisional squad for Copa América Centenario but was cut from the final squad. He later appeared for Colombia at the 2016 Summer Olympics.

Borja was included in the final squad for the 2019 Copa América, acting as a backup to William Tesillo during the tournament.

Personal life
On 1 June 2018, Borja's house was attacked by gunmen; he was unhurt but fellow footballer Alejandro Peñaranda was killed and Heisen Izquierdo was injured.

Honours
Sporting
Primeira Liga: 2020–21
Taça de Portugal: 2018–19
Taça da Liga: 2020–21

Braga
Taça de Portugal: 2020–21

References

External links 

 

1993 births
Living people
Colombian footballers
Footballers from Cali
Association football fullbacks
Association football central defenders
Colombia international footballers
Categoría Primera A players
Liga MX players
Independiente Santa Fe footballers
Cortuluá footballers
Deportivo Toluca F.C. players
Sporting CP footballers
S.C. Braga players
Alanyaspor footballers
Primeira Liga players
Süper Lig players
Footballers at the 2016 Summer Olympics
Olympic footballers of Colombia
2019 Copa América players
Colombian expatriate footballers
Expatriate footballers in Mexico
Expatriate footballers in Portugal
Expatriate footballers in Turkey
Colombian expatriate sportspeople in Mexico
Colombian expatriate sportspeople in Portugal
Colombian expatriate sportspeople in Turkey